Physical plant, mechanical plant or industrial plant (and where context is given, often just plant) refers to the necessary infrastructure used in operation and maintenance of a given facility. The operation of these facilities, or the department of an organization which does so, is called "plant operations" or facility management. Industrial plant should not be confused with "manufacturing plant" in the sense of "a factory". This is a holistic look at the architecture, design, equipment, and other peripheral systems linked with a plant required to operate or maintain it.

Power plants

Nuclear power 
The design and equipment in a Nuclear Power Plant, has for the most part remained stagnant over the last 30 years   There are three types of reactor cooling mechanisms: “Light water reactors, Liquid Metal Reactors and High Temperature Gas-Cooled Reactors”. While for the most part equipment remains the same, there have been some minimal modifications to existing reactors improving safety and efficiency. There have also been significant design changes for all these reactors. However, they remain theoretical and unimplemented. Nuclear power plant equipment can be separated into two categories: Primary systems and Balance-Of-Plant Systems. Primary systems are equipment involved in the production and safety of nuclear power. The reactor specifically has equipment such as, reactor vessels usually surrounding the core for protection, the reactor core which holds fuel rods. It also includes reactor cooling equipment consisting of liquid cooling loops, circulating coolant. These loops are usually separate systems each having at least one pump. Other equipment includes Steam generators and pressurizers that ensures pressure in the plant is adjusted as needed. Containment equipment is the physical structure built around the reactor to protect the surroundings from reactor failure. Lastly primary systems also include Emergency core cooling Equipment and Reactor protection Equipment. Balance-Of-Plant Systems are equipment used commonly across power plants in the production and distribution of power. They utilize; Turbines, Generators, Condensers, Feedwater equipment, auxiliary equipment, fire protection equipment, Emergency power supply equipment and used fuel storage.

Broadcast engineering
In broadcast engineering, the term transmitter plant is the part of the physical plant associated with the transmitter and its controls and inputs, the studio/transmitter link (if the radio studio is off-site), the radio antenna and radomes, feedline and desiccation/nitrogen system, broadcast tower and building, tower lighting, generator, and air conditioning.  These are often monitored by an automatic transmission system, which reports conditions via telemetry (transmitter/studio link).

Telecommunication plants

Fiber optic telecommunications 

Economic constraints such as capital and operating expenditure lead to Passive Optical Networks as the primary fiber optic model used to for connecting users to the fiber optic plant. A central office hub utilities transmission equipment, allowing it to send signals to between one and 32 users per line. The main fiber backbone of a PON network is called an optical line terminal. The operational requirements such as maintenance, equipment sharing efficiency, sharing of the actual fiber and potential need for future expansion, all determine which specific variant of PON is used. A Fiber Optic Splitter is equipment used when multiple users must be connected to the same backbone of fiber. EPON; a variant of PON, which can hold 704 connections in one line. Fibre networks based on a PON backbone have several options in connecting individuals to their network, such as fibre to the “curb/building/home”. This equipment utilises different wavelengths to send and receive data simultaneously and without interference

Cellular telecommunications 
Base stations are a key component of mobile telecommunications infrastructure. They connect the end user to the main network. They have physical barriers protecting transition equipment and are placed on masts or on the roofs/sides of buildings. Where it is located is determined by the local radio frequency coverage that is required. These base stations utilize different kinds of antennas, either on buildings or on landscapes to transmit signals back and forth  Directional antennas are used to direct signals in different direction, whereas line of sight radio-communication antennas, allow for communication in-between base stations.

Base stations are of three types Macro, Micro and Pico cell sub-stations. Macro cells are the most widespread used base station, utilizing omnidirectional or radio-communication dishes. Micro cells are more specialized; these expand and provide additional coverage in areas where macro cells cannot. They are typically placed on streetlights, usually not requiring radio-communication dishes. This is because they are physically interconnected via fiber optic cables. Pico cell stations are further specific, providing additional coverage only within a building when the coverage is poor. This will usually be placed on a roof or a wall in each building.

Desalination plants 

Desalination plants are responsible for removing salt from water sources, so that it becomes usable for human consumption. Reverse osmosis, multi-stage flash and Multi-effect distillation,  are three main types of equipment and processes used that differentiate desalination plants. Thermal technologies such as MSF and MED are the most used in the Middle East, as they have low access to fresh water supply yet have access to excess energy.

Reverse osmosis 
Reverse osmosis plants use “Semi-Permeable Membrane Polymers”, that allow for water to pass through unabated, while blocking molecules not suitable for drinking. Reverse Osmosis plants typically use intake pipes, which allow for water to be abstracted at its source. This water is then taken to pre-treatment centers, of which particles in the water are removed, with chemicals added to prevent water damage.  HR-pumps and booster pumps are used to provide pressure, to pump the water at different heights of the facility, which is then transferred to a reverse osmosis module. This equipment depending on the specifications effectively filters out between 98 and 99.5% of salt from the water. Waste that is separated through these pre-treatment and reverse osmosis modules and taken to an energy recovery module, and any further excess is pumped back out through an outfall pipe. Control equipment is used to monitor this process, to ensure it continues running smoothly. When the water is separated it is then delivered to a household via a distribution network for consumption. Pre-Treatment systems have intake screening equipment such as forebays and screens. Intake equipment can vary in design, open ocean intakes are either placed onshore or off the shore. Offshore intakes transfer water using concrete channels into screening chambers to be transferred directly to pre-treatment centers, using intake pumps where chemicals will be added. It is then dissolved and separated from solids using a flotation device, to be pumped through a semi-permeable membrane.

Electrodialysis 
Electrodialysis competes with reverse osmosis systems and has been used industrially since the 1960s. It uses cathodes and anodes at multiple stages to filter out Ionic compounds into a concentrated form leaving a more pure and safe drinking water. This technology does have a higher cost of energy so unlike reverse osmosis it is mainly used for Brackish water which has a lower salt content than seawater.

Multi-stage flash distillation 
Thermal distillation equipment is commonly used in the middle east similarly to Reverse Osmosis it has a water abstraction and pre-treatment equipment, although in MSF different chemicals such as anti-sealant and anti-corrosives are added. Heating equipment is used at different stages at different pressure levels until it reaches a brine heater. The brine heater is what provides steam at these different stages to change the boiling point of the water.

Traditional water treatment plants 
Conventional  water treatment plant. are used to extract, purify and then distribute water from already drinkable bodies of water. Water treatment plants require a large network of equipment to retrieve, store and transfer water to a plant for treatment. Water from underground water sources are typically extracted via  wells, to be transported to a water treatment plant. Typical well equipment includes pipes, pumps, and shelters. ). If this underground water source is distant from the treatment plant, then aqueducts are commonly used to transport it. Many transport equipment such as aqueducts,  pipes, and tunnels utilize open-channel flow to ensure delivery of the water. This utilizes geography and gravity to allow the water, to naturally flow from one place to another without additional pumps. Flow measurement equipment is used to monitor the flow is consistent with no issues occurring. Watersheds are areas where surface water in each area will naturally flow too and where it is usually stored after collection. For storm water runoffs natural bodies of water as well as filtration systems are used to store and transfer water. Non-Stormwater runoffs use equipment such as septic tanks to treat water onsite, or sewer systems where the water is collected and transferred to a water treatment plant. 
Once water arrives at a plant it undergoes a pre-treatment process where water is passed through screens, such as passive screens or bar screens. Primarily to stop certain kinds of debris from entering equipment further down the facility that could damage it.  After that, a mix of chemicals is added using either a dry chemical feeder, or solution metering pumps. To prevent the water from being unusable or damaging equipment. These chemicals are measured using a electromechanical chemical feed device, to ensure the correct levels of chemicals in the water are maintained. Corrosive resistant pipe material such as PVC plastic, aluminum and Stainless steel are used to transfer water safely due to increases in acidity from pre-treatment. Coagulation is usually the next step, in which salts, such as Ferric Sulfate are used to destabilize organic matter in a mixing tank. Variable-Speed paddle mixers are used to identify the best mix of salts to use for a specific body of water being treated.  Flocculation basins use temperature to condense unsafe particles together. Setting tanks are then used to perform sedimentation, which removes certain solids using gravity so that they accumulate at the bottom of the tank. Rectangular and center feed basins are used to remove the sediment which is taken to sludge processing centers. Filtration then separates larger materials that remain in the water source using; pressure filtration, diatomaceous earth filtration and direct filtration. Water is then disinfected where it is then either stored or distributed for use.

Plant responsibility 
Stakeholders have different responsibilities, for the maintenance of equipment in a water treatment plant. In terms of the distribution equipment to the end user, it is mainly the plant owners who are responsible for the maintenance of this equipment. An Engineers role is more focused on maintaining the equipment used to treat water. Public regulators, are responsible for monitoring water supply quality, ensuring it is safe to drink. These stakeholders have active responsibility for these processes and equipment. Manufacturers primary responsibility, is off site, providing quality assurance of equipment function prior to use.

HVAC

HVAC plant usually includes air conditioning (both heating and cooling systems and ventilation) and other mechanical systems. It often also includes the maintenance of other systems, such as plumbing and lighting. The facility itself may be an office building, a school campus, military base, apartment complex, or the like. HVAC systems can be used to transport heat towards specific areas within a given facility or building. Heat pumps are used to push heat in a certain direction. Specific heat pumps used vary, potentially including, solar thermal and ground source pumps. Other common components are finned tube heat exchanger and fans; however, these are limited and can lead to heat loss. HVAC ventilation systems primarily remove air-borne particles through forced circulation.

See also
Activity relationship chart
Building information modeling
Computerized maintenance management system
Property maintenance
1:5:200, an engineering rule of thumb.
Property management

Footnotes

References
 Ahmad Anas, S 2012, 'Hybrid fiber-to-the-x and free space optics for high bandwidth access networks' Photonic Network Communications, vol. 23, no. 1, pp. 33–39, doi: 10.1007/s11107-011-0333-z.
 Bingley, WM 1972, 'Responsibility for Plant Operations' Journal ‐ American Water Works Association, vol. 64, no. 3, pp. 132–135, doi: 10.1002/j.1551-8833.1972.tb02647.x.
 Fritzmann, C., Löwenberg, J., Wintgens, T. and Melin, T., 2007. State-of-the-art of reverse osmosis desalination. Desalination, 216(1-3), pp. 1–76. 
 2010. NSW Telecommunications facilities guidelines including Broadband. [ebook] New South Wales. Department of Planning, NSW Telecommunications Facilities Guideline Including Broadband. Available at: <https://www.planning.nsw.gov.au/-/media/Files/DPE/Guidelines/nsw-telecommunications-facilities-guideline-including-broadband-2010-07.pdf
 www-pub.iaea.org. 2007. Nuclear Power Plant Design Characteristics. [online] Available at: <https://www-pub.iaea.org/mtcd/publications/pdf/te_1544_web.pdf>
 Henthorne, L. and Boysen, B., 2015. State-of-the-art of reverse osmosis desalination pretreatment. Desalination, 356, pp. 129–139.Taylor, JJ 1989, 'Improved and safer nuclear power' Science, vol. 244, no. 4902, pp. 318–325, doi: 10.1126/science.244.4902.318.
 Jouhara, H & Yang, J 2018, 'Energy efficient HVAC systems' Energy and Buildings, vol. 179, pp. 83–85, doi: 10.1016/j.enbuild.2018.09.001.
 Spellman, FR 2013, Handbook of Water and Wastewater Treatment Plant Operations, Third Edition., 3rd ed., CRC Press, Hoboken.
 Tanji, H 2008, 'Optical fiber cabling technologies for flexible access network. (Report)' Optical Fiber Technology, vol. 14, no. 3, pp. 177–184, doi: 10.1016/j.yofte.2007.11.006.

Building engineering
Broadcast engineering